Telcom is a telecommunications network operator in Somalia. It is the first major privately owned company providing telecommunications services to cities nationwide.

Overview
Telcom is headquartered in Bakaara Market, Mogadishu. It has representative offices in Dubai, UAE and in London, UK, where accounting, international relations and carrier services are handled.

Its chairman is Mohamed Sheikh, with Hassan Ibrahim Mursal serving as CTO and Omar Hussein Adan as chief transmission officer. There are 750 staff employees.

See also
Somtel
Golis Telecom Somalia
Hormuud Telecom
NationLink Telecom
Netco (Somalia)
Somafone
Somali Telecom Group

References
Telcom

External links
Telcom

Telecommunications companies of Somalia
Telecommunications companies established in 1997
Companies based in Mogadishu